Seung-heon, also spelled Seung-hun, is a Korean male given name.

People with this name include:
Lee Seung-heon (born 1950), pen name Lee Ilchi, South Korean self-help writer
Song Seung-heon (born 1976), South Korean actor

See also
List of Korean given names

Korean masculine given names